Warszawa is a live album by experimental rock band Praxis, released in 1999 by the label Innerhythmic.

The album contains three of the supergroup's most influential members: bassist and producer Bill Laswell, guitarist Buckethead, and drummer Brain. This album was recorded during a live show in Warsaw, Poland and has some resemblance to the band's earlier funk-influenced material, containing elements of 1992's Transmutation (Mutatis Mutandis) and the loud heavy metal and noise rock elements reminiscent of 1994's Sacrifist. Besides Laswell, Buckethead and Brain, the album also contains contributions from turntablists Mix Master Mike and PhonosycographDISK.

The album opens with "Initiation", a 20-minute turntable epic that mixes albums like Snoop's Murder Was the Case with kung-fu movie samples.

Track listing

Personnel 
Buckethead – electric guitar
Bill Laswell – bass guitar
Brain – drums, percussion
Mix Master Mike – turntables, samples
PhonosycographDISK – turntables, samples

Recording Staff 
Bill Murphy - Producer
Oz Fritz – Engineer
Michael Fossenkemper – Mastering
Robert Musso – Engineer
Shinro Ohtake – Artwork

References

Praxis (band) albums
1999 live albums